Qeshlaq-e Nariman may refer to:
 Qeshlaq-e Nariman Kandi Amir Aslan
 Qeshlaq-e Nariman Kandi Hajj Khan Owghlan
 Qeshlaq-e Nariman Kandi Hajji Havar